De Motu is Latin for 'On Motion' and is used as the title, or in the title, of a number of notable works:

 De Motu (Berkeley's essay), fully De Motu: Sive, de Motus Principio & Natura, et de Causa Communicationis Motuum ('On Motion: or The Principle and Nature of Motion and the Cause of the Communication of Motions'), a 1721 essay by George Berkeley
 De motu corporum in gyrum ('On the motion of bodies in an orbit'), the presumed title of a manuscript by Isaac Newton sent to Edmond Halley in November 1684
 Exercitatio Anatomica de Motu Cordis et Sanguinis in Animalibus ('An Anatomical Exercise on the Motion of the Heart and Blood in Living Beings'), or De motu cordis, a 1628 book published by William Harvey
 De Motu Antiquiora ('The Older Writings on Motion'), or simply De Motu, Galileo Galilei's early written work on motion, written between 1589 and 1592 but not published until 1687
 De motu animalium ('On the Motion of Animals'), a treatise about by Aristotle
 De motu animalium, by Giovanni Alfonso Borelli (1608–1679), relating animals to machines
 De motu animalium spontaneo, by Pierre Petit (1617–1687), opposing René Descartes and Cartesianism

Latin words and phrases